Hareth Al Naif (born 20 January 1993 in Syria) is a Syrian footballer. He plays for Al-Karamah, which competes in the Syrian Premier League.

Club career
Al Naif started his career with Al Futowa in 2011. He transferred to Tishreen, then Al-Yaqdhah in 2019. He joined Al-Karamah in September 2020.

References

1993 births
Living people
Syrian footballers
Association football defenders
Syrian Premier League players
Al-Karamah players